The Totonac are an indigenous people of Mexico who reside in the states of Veracruz, Puebla, and Hidalgo. They are one of the possible builders of the pre-Columbian city of El Tajín, and further maintained quarters in Teotihuacán (a city which they claim to have built). Until the mid-19th century they were the world's main producers of vanilla.

Etymology

The term "totonac" refers to the people living in Totonacapan. There is no agreement as to the origin of the term. Some authors have translated the term "totonac" as a Nahuatl word meaning "People of Hot Land".
The translation for this word in the Totonac Language, according to sources, is "toto-nacu" meaning "three hearts" signifying their three cities or cultural centers: Cempoala, Tajin and Teayo. Evidence, however, is inconclusive.

Geography and traditional lifestyle

In the 15th century, the Aztecs labeled the region of the Totonac "Totonacapan"; which then extended roughly from Papantla in the north to Cempoala in the south.  Totonacapan was largely hot and humid.  Along with the normal agricultural crops of maize, manioc, squash, beans, pumpkin and chili peppers, the region was noted for its production of cotton.  Even during the disastrous central Mexican famine of 1450-1454, the region remained a reliable agricultural center.  At that time, many Aztecs were forced to sell themselves or their family members as slaves to the Totonac in exchange for subsistence maize.

Diet
There is a total absence of comals, metates and manos meaning the Totonacs did not eat tortillas; however, even though corn was grown it did not form a large part of their diet. The Totonacs ate fruit, most notably zapotes, guavas, papayas, plantains and avocados. Men hunted and fished shark, turtle, deer, armadillo, opossums, and frogs. Women raised turkeys and dogs. Peasants as well as nobles ate corn porridge in the morning. Lunch was the main meal of the day and consisted of manioc, bean stew or even a rich meat sauce for the nobles. Fish and seafood as well as game was eaten by both nobles and farmers. The agave provided liquor.

Clothing
Totonac women were expert weavers and embroiderers; they dressed grandly and braided their hair with feathers. The Franciscan friar Bernardino de Sahagún stated that, in all aspects of their appearance, the women were "quite elegant", women wore skirts (embroidered for the nobles) and a small triangular poncho covering the breasts. Noble women wore shell and jade necklaces and earrings and often tattooed their faces with red ink. Married women wore their hair in the Nahuatl fashion while peasant women wore their hair long. Likewise, the noble men dressed well, adorning themselves with multicolored cloaks, loin cloths, necklaces, arm bands, lip plugs and devices made of the prized quetzal feathers. Hair was kept long with a thick tuft of hair on the top tied up with a ribbon.

Housing
Houses were generally thatched and had an overhang. They were rectangular in shape.

History

The region of Totonacapan was subject to Aztec military incursions from the mid-15th century until the Spanish arrival.  Despite the establishment of Aztec fortifications throughout the region, rebellion was endemic.  Major Totonac centers were Papantla, with an estimated population of 60,000 in 1519, Xalapa (around 120,000), and Cempoala (around 80,000).  Cempoala was the first indigenous city state visited by Hernán Cortés in his march to the Aztec capital of Tenochtitlán.  The Totonacs of Cempoala joined forces with Cortés, and along with the Tlaxcalan Indians, contributed significantly to the Spanish conquest.  Totonacapan became incorporated into the Spanish regime with comparatively little violence, but the region was ravaged by epidemic diseases during the 16th century.  Today, approximately 90,000 Totonac speakers reside in the region.

Language
The Totonac people traditionally speak Totonac, which, together with Tepehua, form a small language family. This means that Totonacan languages are not related to other Native Mesoamerican languages such as those in the Mayan, Oto-Manguean or Uto-Aztecan families. There are several local varieties of Totonac that are not mutually intelligible. The first grammatical and lexical descriptions of Totonac accessible to Europeans (now lost) were by Fray Andrés de Olmos, who also wrote the first such descriptions of Nahuatl and Huastec (Teenek).

The main varieties of Totonac are:
Papantla Totonac: spoken by some 80,000 speakers in El Escolín, Papantla, Cazones, Tajín, Espinal, and other towns along the Gulf Coast of Veracruz.
North-Central Totonac: spoken roughly between Poza Rica in Veracruz and Mecapalapa, Pantepec, and Xicotepec de Juárez in Puebla.
South-Central Totonac: spoken mostly in the Sierra Norte de Puebla, including the towns of Zapotitlán de Méndez, Coatepec, and Huehuetla in Puebla.
Misantla Totonac: spoken by fewer than 500 people in Yecuatla and other communities outside the city of Misantla, Veracruz.

Religion 
Most present-day Totonacs are Roman Catholic. However, their Christian practice is often mixed with vestiges of their traditional religion, a notable instance being la Costumbre, a survival of an old rite of sacrifice in which various seeds are mixed with earth and the blood of fowls and dispersed over the planting fields.

The traditional religion was described in the early 1960s by the French ethnographer, Alain Ichon. No other major essay on Totonac religion has been found. Mother goddesses played a very important role in Totonac belief, since each person's soul is made by them. If a newly born child dies, its soul "does not go to the west, the place of the dead, but to the east with the Mothers". Ichon has also preserved for posterity an important myth regarding a maize deity, a culture hero with counterparts among most other cultures of the Gulf Coast and possibly also represented by the Classic Maya maize god. As to traditional curers, it is believed that they "are born during a storm, under the protection of thunder. They think that a lightning bolt strikes the house of a new-born baby ..., and makes it ... under its possession".

Other known deities include Chichiní (the sun) and Aktzin.

See also

Danza de los Voladores de Papantla
Maya maize god
Aktzin

Notes

References
James Olson, ed.  Historical Dictionary of the Spanish Empire, 1402-1975, 1992.
I. Bernal and E. Dávalos, Huastecos y Totonacos, 1953.
H.R. Harvey and Isabel Kelly, "The Totonac," in Handbook of Middle American Indians, 1969.
Isabel Kelly and Ángel Palerm, The Tajín Totonac, 1952.
Ichon, A. : La religión de los totonacas de la sierra. México : Instituto Nacional Indigenista, 1973.
 ELLISON, Nicolas: Semé sans compter. Appréhension de l'environnement et statut de l'économie en pays totonaque (Sierra de Puebla, Mexique). Editions de la Maison des Sciences de l'Homme, 2013.
 Ellison, N., 2020. “Altepet / Chuchutsipi: Cosmopolítica territorial totonaca-nahua y patrimonio biocultural en la Sierra Nororiental de Puebla” , Revista TRACE, 78, CEMCA, julio 2020, págs. 88-122, ISSN: 2007-2392.
 LOZADA VÁZQUEZ, Luz María: El papel de Progresa en la reproducción de las unidades domésticas campesinas : Estudio en una comunidad totonaca de Huehuetla, Puebla, Mexico, Universidad nacional autónoma de México, 2002.
 LOZADA VÁZQUEZ, Luz María:  « Chaleur et odeurs pour nos morts. La cuisine cérémonielle de la Fête des Morts dans une communauté Totonaque de Puebla, Mexique », in Food and History 6 (2) 2008 : 133-154. 
 Ellison, N : «  Symbolisme sylvestre et rapports d’altérité dans une danse rituelle totonaque ». Annales de la Fondation Fyssen. n°22, 2007, pp. 83–97.
 Ellison N.: « Au service des Saints : Cultiver la forêt, nourrir la terre, protéger la communauté » in Cahiers d’Anthropologie Sociale, N°3, 2007, pp. 81–96.   
 Ellison N. : « Les enjeux locaux de la  ‘reconstitution des peuples indiens’ au Mexique. Reconfiguration des rapports entre minorités et pouvoirs publics,  le cas totonaque », in  Cahiers des Amériques Latines, N°52, (Novembre-Décembre), 2006 ; pp.   5. 
 Ellison N. : « Une écologie symbolique totonaque, le municipe de Huehuetla (Mexique) »,   Journal de la Société des Américanistes, pp. 35-62,  Tome 90-2, 2004.
 Ellison N. : « Cambio ecológico y percepción ambiental en la región totonaca de Huehuetla ». Actes du colloque international «Territoires et Migrations » (Zacatecas, Mexique), Sociedad Mexicana de Antropología, Mexico. Version publiée dans la revue électronique Nuevo Mundo, Mundos Nuevos (CNRS/EHESS), 2003, n°3.

External links

 Interdisciplinary bibliography of research on the Totonac culture
Catholic encyclopedia entry
 Ellison, N. : Semé sans compter. Appréhension de l'environnement et statut de l'économie en pays totonaque
 Ellison, N., 2020. “Altepet / Chuchutsipi: Cosmopolítica territorial totonaca-nahua y patrimonio biocultural en la Sierra Nororiental de Puebla” 
 Ellison N. : Cambio ecológico y percepción ambiental en la región totonaca
 Ellison, N. : Les Totonaques aujourd’hui, entre crise du développement et nouvelles revendications
 Lozada Vazquez, L.M.:Chaleur et odeurs pour nos morts. La cuisine cérémonielle de la Fête des Morts totonaque